Tamim ibn Zayd al-Utbi was the caliphal governor of Sind in 726–731. He succeeded al-Junayd ibn Abd al-Rahman al-Murri.

In 726, the Umayyads replaced al-Junayd with Tamim as the governor of Sind. During the next few years, all of the gains made by Junayd were lost. The Arab records do not explain why, except to state that the Caliphate's troops, drawn from distant lands, abandoned their posts in India and refused to go back. The historian Khalid Yahya Blankinship mentions the possibility that the Indians revolted, but deemed it more likely that the cause of the losses stemmed from internal issues among the Arabs.

Tamim is said to have fled Sind and died ''en route.

References

731 deaths
Date of birth unknown
Umayyad governors of Sind
8th-century Arabs